Woods and Caples General Store (also known as Grove Furniture Store) is a general store located at Forest Grove, Oregon. It is listed on the National Register of Historic Places in 1985.

History 
The general store was built in 1893. It is considered as an important landmark in Forest Grove Downtown Historic District. Along with First Church of Christ, Scientist, it is listed with NRHP.

References

1893 establishments in Oregon
Forest Grove, Oregon
National Register of Historic Places in Washington County, Oregon
General stores in the United States